Rosa Oppenheimer (31 July 1887 − 2 November 1943) was a German Jewish art dealer who was murdered in the Holocaust. The art she owned together with her husband Jacob is the subject of several high-profile restitution claims.

Early life 
Rosa Silberstein was born on 31 July 1887 in Berlin and died in the Nazi concentration camp in Auschwitz on 2 November 1943. She married Jakob Oppenheimer and took his name. They worked together as art dealers.

Art Dealer 
Rosa's husband Jakob was the managing director of Margraf and Co, which was owned by Albert Loeske who died in 1929. Rosa and Jakob Oppenheimer worked for the Galerie Van Diemen, which was part of the Margraf group.

In his will Loeske left the Margraf group to the Openheimers but the Nazis would not allow Jewish directors.

Nazi persecution, deportation and death 
Under Hitler's Third Reich, a Nazi and close friend of Hermann Göring, Bolko von Richthofen, was named director of the Margraf group. In 1935 the art was auctioned off in forced sales at the Paul Graupe auction house.

The Oppenheimers fled to France in 1933. Jakob Oppenheimer died there as an impoverished refugee in 1941. Rosa was interned in at the Drancy camp in France, then deported and died in Auschwitz on 2 November 1943.

Restitution claims 
The heirs of Jacob and Rosa Oppenheimer have filed several restitution claims for art seized by Nazis or relinquished in forced sales.

In 2008 the Dutch Restitutions Committee recommended that artworks be returned to the Oppenheimer family, stating, "In the Committee’s opinion, the applicants have sufficiently shown that the work of art was auctioned at a forced auction set up by the Nazi authorities to implement anti-Jewish measures and the Committee therefore adjudges that it can be considered involuntary loss of possession as a result of circumstances directly related to the Nazi regime."  

In 2009, following years of investigation two Renaissance paintings that had been in a forced sale in 1935 were restituted by the Hearst Castle which said that Hearst was not aware of their origins when he acquired them from  I.S. Goldschmidt Gallery in Berlin.

In 2011, the Museum of Fine Arts in Boston reached an agreement with the Oppenheimer family concerning a settlement for tapestries that had been the object of a forced sale.

Also in 2011 the Landesmuseum Württemberg in Stuttgart, Germany restituted to the Oppenheimer heirs a 16th-century wooden sculpture of St. John the Baptist that had been looted by Nazis in 1933, then auctioned off to Heinemann and Dr. Benno Griesbert.

In 2017 the heirs demanded the restitution of  two paintings which were at the National Gallery of Ireland which refused the claim based on the research of a provenance expert

References

German art dealers
German Jews who died in the Holocaust
Nazi-looted art
Women art dealers
German people who died in Auschwitz concentration camp
1887 births
1943 deaths
Jewish emigrants from Nazi Germany to France
Jews and Judaism in Germany
Subjects of Nazi art appropriations